Whole Damn Body is a compilation EP by Welsh indie rock band Los Campesinos!, independently released on 7 May 2021. It is a collection of unreleased songs from the recording sessions of their fourth album, Hello Sadness (2011), and was released digitally and on cassette to coincide with the record's tenth anniversary.

Release 
Throughout 2011 and 2012, the band issued a bi-annual magazine titled Heat Rash, where subscribers would receive a 7-inch single featuring two exclusive, unreleased tracks in each drop. Six out of the seven tracks on Whole Damn Body are derived from this programme. The EP was surprise-released via Bandcamp on 7 May 2021, coinciding with the tenth anniversary of their fourth studio album, Hello Sadness (2011). The EP's only physical version was a cassette.

Reception 
Writing for Far Out, Tyler Golsen called the record "seven tracks of high energy no bullshit rock and roll", demonstrating "the band at their wittiest, catchiest, and thoughtful best". He continued that the EP "barely gives you time to breathe, much less take in all that’s happening on the relatively short run time", praising its complex themes and imagery.
Abby Jones of music publication Pitchfork commended the record's lyricism and thematic consistency with their back catalogue, "filled with the band’s sticky hooks and guttural vocals". Nick Matthopoulos of Atwood Magazine praised Whole Damn Body for presenting "beautifully and poetically miserable highs and lows", containing "clever and emotional lyrics, a range of energy and dynamics, and equally expressive instrumentation".

Track listing 
Original releases

 Heat Rash edition No. 1 (April 2011) contained "Light Leaves, Dark Sees" and "Four Seasons"
 Heat Rash edition No. 3 (June 2012) contained "Allez Les Blues" and "Dumb Luck"
 Heat Rash edition No. 4 (November 2012) contained "She Crows" and "To the Boneyard".

Personnel 
Musicians

 Los Campesinos!, specifically:
 Tom Bromley – writing; producer, mixing, recording , brass arrangement
 Gareth Paisey – writing, vocals
 Neil Turner – writing , guitar
 Rob Taylor – artwork
 Harriet Coleman – vocals , violin 
 Samantha Boshnack – trumpet, flugelhorn 
 Nelson Bell – trombone, tuba 
 Jherek Bischoff – brass arrangement

Technical

 John Goodmanson – producer, mixing, recording 
 Jose Luis Molero – engineering
 Eric Corson – engineering
 Simon Francis – mastering

Release history

References 

2021 EPs
2021 compilation albums
EPs by Welsh artists
Los Campesinos! albums
Albums produced by John Goodmanson